Forever Activists: Stories from the Veterans of the Abraham Lincoln Brigade is a 1990 documentary film by Connie Field and Judith Montell that shares interviews with seven American veterans of the Spanish Civil War who fought for the Loyalist cause during the war and went on to live lives of activism.

Accolades
It was nominated for an Academy Award for Best Documentary Feature.

Production
It was narrated by Ronnie Gilbert.

The film makes the point that for many of the men and women who fought in the Spanish Civil War it was just one of a series of continuing social struggles that they believed in.
The film's highlight is a reunion of the veterans in Spain in 1986, on the 50th anniversary of the war's outbreak.

See also
Abraham Lincoln Brigade
Jewish volunteers in the Spanish Civil War
Spanish Civil War
List of American films of 1990
Other documentaries about Jewish activism
Professional Revolutionary

References

External links

BFI

1990 films
1990 documentary films
American documentary films
Documentary films about the Spanish Civil War
Documentary films about veterans
Films about activists
Films directed by Connie Field
1990s English-language films
1990s American films